The Dodge Mining Camp Cabin is located in Dodgeville, Wisconsin.

History
The cabin was built by Henry Dodge. Dodge was a noted military officer who would later become Governor of the Wisconsin Territory and a member of the United States House of Representatives and the United States Senate. Believed to be the oldest building in Iowa County, Wisconsin, the cabin was previously located down the road at 217 East Fountain Street before being moved to its current location. Currently, it serves as a museum. It was added to the State and the National Register of Historic Places in 2005.

See also
List of the oldest buildings in Wisconsin

References

Houses on the National Register of Historic Places in Wisconsin
Log buildings and structures on the National Register of Historic Places in Wisconsin
National Register of Historic Places in Iowa County, Wisconsin
Houses in Iowa County, Wisconsin
Historic house museums in Wisconsin
Museums in Iowa County, Wisconsin
Houses completed in 1827